Oulton Raiders are an amateur rugby league football club from Oulton in Leeds, West Yorkshire. The club's open age team currently compete in the top division of the National Conference League. The club also operates many youth teams.

External links
Oulton Raiders ARLFC on NCL website

Rugby league teams in West Yorkshire
BARLA teams
English rugby league teams